Muhammad Khasru (1946 – 19 February 2019) was a Bangladeshi journalist and activist who pioneered the film society movement in the country. He played an important role in establishing the Federation of Film Societies of Bangladesh in 1973 and Bangladesh Film Archive in 1978.

Early life
Khasru was born in 1946 at Hooghly district of West Bengal, India. His father worked at the Hooghly Jute Mill. But after the communal riots broke out in India, his family migrated to Dhaka in the 1950s. They settled in their ancestral home at Mohonpur village in Keraniganj Upazila of Dhaka district.

Works and writing: Bangladesher Cholochitro Songsod Andolon, Dhrupadi (an edited works).

Award
 Lifetime achievement award of Dhaka University Film Society (2017)

References

1946 births
2019 deaths
Bangladeshi journalists
Bangladeshi activists
People from Hooghly district
Bangladeshi people of Indian descent